Göztepe is an underground station on the Fahrettin Altay—Evka 3 Line of the İzmir Metro in Göztepe, Konak. Located under İnönü Avenue, it consists of two side platforms servicing two tracks. Connection to ESHOT bus service is available at street level.

Göztepe was opened on 25 March 2014 as part of a single station westward extension of the line from Hatay and was the western terminus of the line from 25 March 2014 to 27 July 2014. The extension to Fahrettin Altay opened on 27 July 2014.

Connections
ESHOT operates city bus service on İnönü Avenue.

Nearby Places of Interest
American Collegiate Institute

References

İzmir Metro
Railway stations opened in 2013
2013 establishments in Turkey
Railway stations in İzmir Province